AQA may refer to or stand for:

aqa
 aqa, the ISO 639-5 for the unspecified Alacalufan languages

Aqa
 Aqa, one of two villages in Iran
 Aqa, Kermanshah
 Aqa, Lorestan

AQA
 AST-Quadram-Ashton-Tate, an alliance responsible for the definition of the Enhanced Expanded Memory Specification (EEMS)
 Assessment and Qualifications Alliance, an exam board in England, Wales and Northern Ireland
 The Aquatic Sector in the Metroid Fusion video game
 Australian Quadriplegic Association, renamed Spinal Cord Injuries Australia
 Analytical quality assurance
 IATA code for Araraquara Airport
 AQA (wrestler), professional wrestler